Euploea nechos is a butterfly found in the Solomon Islands that belongs to the danaid group of the brush-footed butterflies family. The species was first described by Mathew in 1887.

Description

Subspecies 
E. n. nechos
E. n. pronax Godman & Salvin, 1888
E. n. prusias Godman & Salvin, 1888

See also
Danainae
Nymphalidae
Butterflies of the Solomon Islands

References

Butterflies of Indochina
Euploea